Choi Joon-gi (born April 13, 1994) is a South Korean football player. He plays for Jeonnam Dragons.

Career
Choi Joon-gi joined J2 League club Thespakusatsu Gunma in 2017.

References

External links

1994 births
Living people
South Korean footballers
J2 League players
K League 2 players
Thespakusatsu Gunma players
Seongnam FC players
Jeonnam Dragons players
Association football defenders